Édgar Genaro Huerta Márquez (born 19 October 1997) is a Mexican footballer who plays as a midfielder for Morelia.

References

External links
 
 
 Debut with Morelia

He is also a singer
1997 births
Living people
Mexican footballers
Association football midfielders
Atlético Morelia players
Alebrijes de Oaxaca players
Liga MX players
Ascenso MX players
Tercera División de México players
Footballers from Tamaulipas
People from Matamoros, Tamaulipas